Daphne Wright (born 1963) is an Irish visual artist, who makes sculptural installations using a variety of techniques and media to explore how a range of languages and materials can be used to probe unspoken human preoccupations. Recent international exhibition highlights include Hotspot, Galleria Nazionale d’Arte Moderna e Contemporanea, Rome, curated by Gerardo Mosquera; Daphne Wright: Prayer Project, Davis Museum, USA, Portals; the Hellenic Parliament with ΝΕΟΝ, Athens; Infinite Sculpture, Gulbenkian Museum, Lisbon. Wright curated the 2018 exhibition The Ethics of Scrutiny at the Irish Museum of Modern Art as part of the Freud Project. Wright has received the Paul Hamlyn Award, The Henry Moore Foundation Fellowship, and The British School of Rome fellowship. She is a member of Aosdana and is represented by Frith Street Gallery, London.

Education 

Wright was born in 1963, in Co. Longford, Ireland. She studied at the Atlantic Technological University, Sligo between 1981–1985, National College of Art & Design, Dublin between 1985–87 and between 1989–1991 at Newcastle-upon -Tyne Polytechnic.

Work 

Wright's work is "concerned with boundaries and the transitory areas of life, exploring the cusp of childhood and adulthood, as well as the spaces and borderlines between life and death." As described by Robert Preece, "Using a wide range of materials and techniques—plaster, tin foil, video, printmaking, found objects, and performance—she creates beautiful and rather eerie worlds that feel like the threshold to somewhere new."

Wright's most recent body of work was shown in  A quiet mutiny in Crawford Art Gallery, 2019 and A quiet mutiny - persists, 2020 at Frith Street Gallery London. In this body of work Wright creates worlds that are beautifully eerie: familiar objects from everyday life come under the artist’s scrutiny including buggies, houseplants, tall homegrown sunflowers, a fridge and a child’s drawing. Expanding on her existing sculptural practice, Wright focuses on the materiality of dry, unfired clay creating a dichotomy of familiarity and fragility. Wright’s objects are chosen for their momentary quality, these objects are only fleetingly valued in our daily lives. This work builds on Wrights extensive on-going series of figurative sculpture works, including the pieces Kitchen Table (2014), a Jesmonite cast of the two figures of the artists sons, two chairs and table with oil cloth, hand-painted in watercolour. Other sculpture works such as Stallion (2009) consist of the cast of a dead stallion, positioned by the artist, and rendered in marble dust and resin. Recent video works of note include Is everyone OK? (2019), Song of Songs (2019) and I know what it's like (2012).

Exhibitions 

Wright's work is shown in both solo and group exhibitions in Britain and internationally. Recent exhibition highlights include: 2022: Hotspot, Galleria Nazionale d’Arte Moderna e Contemporanea, Rome; No Time to Spare, Tap-gol Museum of Art, Seoul Welfare Center for the Elderly; 2021: Portals, former Public Tobacco Factory – Hellenic Parliament Library and Printing House, a collaboration between the Hellenic Parliament and ΝΕΟΝ, Athens, Greece; 2020: A quiet mutiny - persists, Frith Street Gallery, London (solo); Infinite Sculpture: From the Antique Cast to the 3D Scan, Gulbenkian Museum, Lisbon; 2019: Daphne Wright: a quiet mutiny, Crawford Art Gallery, Cork (solo); Infinite Sculpture: Casts and Copies from the antique to today, Musée des Beaux Arts, Paris; The Size of Thoughts, White Conduit Projects, London; RWA Sculpture Open, Royal West of England Academy, Bristol; Domestic Bliss, Gallery of Modern Art, Glasgow; 2017: Daphne Wright: Prayer Project, Davis Museum at Wellesley College, MA (solo); Emotional Archaeology, Royal Hibernian Academy, Dublin (solo); Kapı Çalana Açılır, Abdülmecid Efendi Köşkü, Üsküdar, Istanbul; 2016: Emotional Archaeology, Arnolfini, Bristol and National Trust, Tyntesfield (solo); 2015: At a time, Limerick City Gallery of Art, Limerick (solo); Qwaypurlake, Hauser & Wirth Somerset, Bruton; Plura (Project Spaces), Irish Museum of Modern Art, Dublin; 2010: Frith Street Gallery, London (solo); 2009: The Prayer Project, The Quad Gallery, Derby, 2006: Sires, Limerick City Gallery of Art, Ireland (solo).

Wright has produced a series of large-scale commissions and her work is housed in many collections internationally; 'Still life' at Hanbury Hall, Worcester, 'Plura', South Tipperary County Council and IMMA Irish Museum of Modern Art, 'Stallion', VISUAL Carlow, Ireland, 'Home Ornaments', Gorbals, Glasgow, in association with CWZG Architects and The Artworks Programme and GOMA, Glasgow, 'Theses Talking Walls ' New Art Centre, Salisbury, 'Prayer Project' Derby with Picture This Bristol, and 'Garden of Reason', Ham House and Garden, Richmond. Her work is housed in the collections of Irish Museum of Modern Art, Dublin; Crawford Art Gallery, Cork; Gallery of Modern Art, Glasgow; Hamburger Kunsthalle, Hamburg, Germany; National Gallery of Ireland, Dublin; Towner Art Gallery, Sussex (purchased through Contemporary Art Society and Arts Council of England) and Vehbi Koç Collection, Istanbul, Turkey, amongst many others.

Recognition 

Wright has received the following awards and fellowships; Henry Moore Foundation Fellowship, Manchester Metropolitan University, Cheltenham Fellowship, British School at Rome Award in Sculpture and the 1996 Paul Hamlyn Award.

References

External links
 Aosdána
 Circa, Summer 2004
 Garden of Reason- Daphne Wright, Artist Profile
 The Artworks Programme
 Picture This, Works & Projects
 Now Wakes the Sea, Kinsal Arts Festival
 Daphne Wright at Frith Street Gallery

Aosdána members
Irish contemporary artists
1963 births
Living people
Irish women artists
Alumni of the National College of Art and Design
Alumni of the Institute of Technology, Sligo